Derancistrus is a genus of beetles in the family Cerambycidae, containing the following species:

 Derancistrus anthracinus (Gahan, 1890)
 Derancistrus coeruleus Lameere, 1912
 Derancistrus elegans (Palisot de Beauvois, 1805)
 Derancistrus hovorei Lingafelter & Woodley, 2007
 Derancistrus pilosus Devesa, Fonseca & Barro, 2017

References

Prioninae